The Adelaide Festival of Arts, also known as the Adelaide Festival, an arts festival, takes place in the South Australian capital of Adelaide in March each year. Started in 1960, it is a major celebration of the arts and a significant cultural event in Australia.

The festival is based chiefly in the city centre and its parklands, with some venues in the inner suburbs (such as the Odeon Theatre, Norwood) or occasionally further afield. The Adelaide Festival Centre and River Torrens usually form the nucleus of the event, and in the 21st century Elder Park has played host to opening ceremonies.

It comprises many events, usually including opera, theatre, dance, classical and contemporary music, cabaret, literature, visual art and new media. The four-day world-music event, WOMADelaide, and the literary festival, Adelaide Writers' Week, form part of the Festival. The festival originally operated biennially, along with the (initially unofficial) Adelaide Fringe; the Fringe has taken place annually since 2007, with the Festival of Arts going annual a few years later, in 2012. With all of these events, plus the extra visitors, activities and music concerts brought by the street-circuit motor-racing event known as the Adelaide 500, locals often refer to the time of year as "Mad March".

The festival attracts interstate and overseas visitors, and generated an estimated gross expenditure of  million for South Australia .

History
The Adelaide Festival began with efforts by Sir Lloyd Dumas in the late 1950s to establish a major arts festival that would bring to South Australia world-class cultural exhibitions. In 1958, Sir Lloyd organised a gathering of prominent members of the Adelaide business, arts and government community. The proposal for an event similar to the Edinburgh International Festival was supported and the first Festival Board of Governors was formed.

The event began to take form when Sir Lloyd partnered with John Bishop, Professor of Music at the University of Adelaide. The two gained the support of the Lord-Mayor and Adelaide City Council and a financial backing of 15,000 pounds. A number of leading businesses sponsored the first festival, including The Advertiser, the Bank of Adelaide, John Martin & Co., the Adelaide Steamship Company, and Kelvinator.

The inaugural Adelaide Festival of Arts ran from 12 to 26 March 1960 and was directed by Bishop with some assistance from Ian Hunter, the artistic director of the Edinburgh Festival. There were 105 shows covering almost all aspects of the arts. In its first year, it also spawned the Adelaide Fringe, which has grown into the largest event of its kind in the world after the Edinburgh Fringe.

The Adelaide Festival continued to grow in successive years with the support of the South Australian Government. It developed a number of incorporated events including Adelaide Writers' Week, Australia's original literary festival; WOMADelaide, the world music festival; and, the Adelaide Festival of Ideas.  The Adelaide International was a curated international contemporary visual arts program held in partnership with the Samstag Museum from 2010 to 2014.

After some difficulties under the directorship of Peter Sellars in 2001–2, it was once again regarded as very strong, with its reputation intact as the pre-eminent event in the country, by 2006.

The Adelaide Festival moved from a biennial to annual event from 2012.

David Sefton was appointed as artistic director for a three-year tenure in 2013, then extended for another year. The 2013 program included for the first time, a three-night "festival within a festival": Unsound Adelaide presented international artists playing multi-dimensional electronic music.

Neil Armfield  and Rachel Healy were appointed in 2015 and took over from Sefton as co-artistic directors from the 2017 festival, which included the landmark opera production of Barrie Kosky's Saul. Their contracts were extended twice, and due to finish with the 2023 festival. However, the 2021 and 2022 festivals were affected by frequently changing restrictions imposed by the government due to various waves of the COVID-19 pandemic in South Australia, which was challenging for the organisers, and also Armfield had some health issues.

In March 2022 it was announced that Ruth Mackenzie  would be taking over from 2023, although Armfield and Healy had already confirmed or organised most of the major events for the festival. McKenzie has extensive international experience, including as director of the Holland Festival and Manchester International Festival, and overseeing the cultural program for the 2012 London Olympics, the London 2012 Festival.

Governance
In 1998 the Adelaide Festival Corporation was established as a statutory corporation by the Adelaide Festival Corporation Act 1998 (AFC Act), reporting to the Minister for the Arts. From about 1996 Arts SA (later Arts South Australia) had responsibility for this and several other statutory bodies such as the South Australian Museum and the Art Gallery of South Australia, until late 2018, when the functions were transferred to direct oversight by the Department of the Premier and Cabinet, Arts and Culture section. There is a governing board which reports to the minister.  the chair was Judy Potter.

Artistic directors are appointed on fixed contracts for one or more years. Former chief executive Elaine Chia departed in November 2021, with Kath M. Mainland being appointed from April 2022. There is a separate director of Writers' Week.

Funding

In June 2019, it was announced that the Festival would receive  in annual funding over the following three years, to help "continue to attract major performances and events".

Funding is mainly from government sources, but, as a charitable body, the festival also attracts private donors within Australia and internationally. During the tenureship of Neil Armfield and Rachel Healy as co-artistic directors, donations to the festival increased from around  a year in 2017 to A$2 million in 2022.

Past festivals
Neil Armfield and Rachel Healy hold the record for the most stints as director, with six festivals under their belt.

There were no directors for the festivals of 1966 and 1968, with an advisory board taking on the responsibility. Peter Sellars' brief directorship of the 2002 Adelaide Festival remains the most controversial and he was eventually replaced by Sue Nattrass.

References

Further reading
 50th anniversary (2010) - history (Archived page)
History of the Adelaide Festival of the Arts (Downloadable PDF from archived page) 
 Past Adelaide Festival programs

External links
 

 Adelaide Festival Theatre

Arts festivals in Australia
Festivals in Adelaide
Festivals established in 1960
1960 establishments in Australia
Annual events in Australia
Autumn events in Australia